Julia Reggiani (born 22 April 1970) is a French former freestyle swimmer who competed in the 1992 Summer Olympics.

References

1970 births
Living people
French female freestyle swimmers
Olympic swimmers of France
Swimmers at the 1992 Summer Olympics
Mediterranean Games gold medalists for France
Mediterranean Games medalists in swimming
Swimmers at the 1991 Mediterranean Games